Dragons are an Irish women's cricket team that compete in the Women's Super Series. They first competed in the Super Series from its inception in 2015 until 2019, after which the tournament was reduced to two teams during the COVID-19 pandemic, with Dragons missing out. In 2022 the team returned to the Super Series and, after initially having no geographical base, would return with a "Northern Irish focus".  They have won three Super Series titles: in 2016, 2018 and 2019.

History
Dragons were established in 2015 to compete in the Women's Super 3s, a tournament designed to bridge the gap between club cricket and international cricket in Ireland. The team was made up of some of the best players in Irish cricket, and were captained by Mary Waldron and coached by Rob O'Connor. In their first season Dragons finished 2nd in the group of 3, with four victories.

The following season, this time captained by Laura Delany, Dragons won their first Super 3s title, with four wins from six matches. They went unbeaten throughout the 50 over section of the tournament, and won one of their two T20s, a last ball thriller against Scorchers. The next season, 2017, Dragons fared worse, finishing bottom of the league with just two victories from ten matches.

2018 brought a return to form for the Dragons, as they won their second Super 3s title, led by Shauna Kavanagh. Highlights for the season included Cecelia Joyce's 118 in a victory over Scorchers, and Lara Maritz's bowling performances throughout the season. The following season, 2019, Dragons retained their title, their second in two seasons and third overall. They were victorious in five of their 10 matches, with a further three curtailed due to rain. They were captained by Kim Garth and coached by Clare Shillington.

In 2020, the tournament was forced into a restructure due to the COVID-19 pandemic and was reduced to two teams, with Dragons the team to miss out. Due to the ongoing effects of the pandemic, Dragons were again unable to compete in 2021.

In 2022, it was announced that Dragons would return to the Super Series for the upcoming season. The returning side was to have a Northern Ireland focus, with half of the squad playing for Northern Irish clubs, and employing a Northern Irish-based coach, James Cameron-Dow. Leah Paul captained the side. The side finished as runners-up in the Super 20 Trophy and in third in the Super 50 Cup.

Players

Current squad
Based on squad announced for the 2022 season. Players in bold have international caps.

Seasons

Women's Super Series

Honours
 Women's Super Series:
 Winners (3): 2016, 2018 & 2019

References

Women's cricket teams in Ireland
Women's Super Series